This is a list of notable Christian theologians listed chronologically by century of birth.

1st century

2nd century

3rd century

4th century

5th century

6th century

7th century

8th century

9th century

11th century

12th century

13th century

14th century

15th century

16th century

17th century

18th century

19th century

20th century

21st century

See also
List of Catholic philosophers and theologians
Doctor of the Church (Catholicism / Orthodox Christianity)
List of Methodist theologians
List of Reformed Baptists
List of Renewal theologians
Christian theologian

References

Christian theologians
Christian theologians
Theologians
Theologians